is a Quasi-National Park on the coast of Ōita and Miyazaki Prefectures, Japan. It was established in 1974.

Related municipalities
 Miyazaki: Hyūga, Kadogawa, Nobeoka
 Ōita: Ōita, Saiki, Tsukumi, Usuki

See also
 List of national parks of Japan
 Bungo Channel

References

External links
 
 Map of Nippō Kaigan Quasi-National Park (Miyazaki)
 Maps of Nippō Kaigan Quasi-National Park (Ōita)

National parks of Japan
Parks and gardens in Ōita Prefecture
Parks and gardens in Miyazaki Prefecture
Protected areas established in 1974